Las Tablas is a station on Line 10 of the Madrid Metro and Line 1 of the Metro Ligero. It is located in fare Zone A.

References 

Line 10 (Madrid Metro) stations
Railway stations in Spain opened in 2007
Buildings and structures in Fuencarral-El Pardo District, Madrid
Madrid Metro Ligero stations